"Lizie Wan" is Child ballad 51 and a murder ballad. It is also known as "Fair Lizzie".

Synopsis
The heroine (called variously Lizie, Rosie or  Lucy) is pregnant with her brother's child. Her brother murders her.  He tries to pass off the blood as that of some animal he had killed (his greyhound, his falcon, his horse), but in the end must admit that he murdered her.  He sets sail in a ship, never to return.

Parallels
This ballad, in several variants, contains most of the ballad "Edward", Child 13.

Other ballads on this theme include "Sheath and Knife", "The King's Dochter Lady Jean", and "The Bonny Hind".

In popular culture 
The Ballad of Lizie Wan was the inspiration for the title song from English recording artist Kate Bush's album The Kick Inside. It is directly referenced in an early demo recording of the song in the second verse: "You and me on the bobbing knee / Welling eyes from identifying with Lizie Wan's story." The final version of the song replaces the direct reference and describes the ballad as "old mythology."

A dark ambient version of the song, titled "Lucy Wan," appeared on the 1993 album Murder Ballads (Drift) by Martyn Bates and Mick Harris.

See also
The King's Dochter Lady Jean
List of the Child Ballads

References

External links
Lizie Wan with variants
Lucy Wan with notes and more variants
Lizie Wan; folklorist.org

Child Ballads
Incest in fiction
Murder ballads
Sororicide in fiction